Raed (Arabic:) is an Arabic male name, meaning leader or pioneer.

People
 Raed Arafat (born 1964), Syrian-born physician of Palestinian descent and Romanian citizenship
 Raed Elhamali, Libyan-American basketball player
 Raed Fares, Syrian journalist, activist and civil society leader from Kafr Nabl, Syria
 Raed Jarrar, Iraqi-born architect, blogger, and political advocate
 Ra'ed Al-Nawateer, Jordanian footballer
 Raed Salah, Palestinian politician
Raed al-Saleh, founder and director of the Syria Civil Defense, known as the White Helmets
 Raed Zidan, first Palestinian man to Summit Mount Everest, first Palestinian man to complete the Seven Summits

Arabic masculine given names